St Alban the Martyr, Birmingham is a Grade II* listed Church of England parish church in the Anglican Diocese of Birmingham. It is dedicated to Saint Alban, the first British Christian martyr.

In 2018, the church was on Historic England's Heritage at Risk Register due to its poor condition, particularly the roof.

History 

A temporary church was established as a mission of Holy Trinity Church, Bordesley in 1865 and opened on 13 September 1866.
 
The permanent church was designed by John Loughborough Pearson and built by the contractor Shillitoe of Doncaster.  Work started in 1880 and the church opened in 1881. The formal consecration took place on 4 December 1899. The construction cost was in the region of £20,000 (equivalent to £ in ).

The patron is Keble College, Oxford.

St Alban's Church took over the parish of St Patrick's Church, Bordesley when St Patrick's was demolished in the early 1970s.

Present day
St Alban's Church stands in the Anglo-Catholic tradition of the Church of England. The parish had passed Resolutions A and B of the Priests (Ordination of Women) Measure 1993, meaning they rejected the ordination of women, but these expired in 2016. They also voted on Alternative Episcopal Oversight, but this was rejected. In 2017, they voted on the replacement of Resolutions A and B, the Resolution under the House of Bishops' Declaration: "This was not carried, with equal votes for and against." This means that the parish would now accept a woman priest.

Architecture 

The cruciform building is in red brick, with dressings in ashlar. The tower and spire were added in 1938 by Edwin Francis Reynolds. The interior features a stained glass east window by Henry Payne and, in the south chapel, a copper Arts and Crafts triptych with painted panels, by local artists Kate and Myra Bunce and donated by them in 1919 in memory of their sisters and parents.

A Birmingham Civic Society blue plaque honouring the Bunce sisters was unveiled at St Alban's in September 2015, by the Lord Mayor of Birmingham.

Vicars

 
 
 
 
 
 
 
 
 
 
 
 
 
 
 2017-present: Dr Gerald Sykes

Organ
The organ dates was installed second-hand in 1870 and was by Bryceson Son & Ellis. It was overhauled in 1940 by Rushworth and Dreaper of Liverpool who extended the compass to C and added electro-pneumatic action. The Pedal Trombone, Great Tuba and Swell 5-rank mixture were added at this date. A new oak organ case was created by Birmingham Sculptors Ltd and Craftinwood Ltd. A specification of the organ can be found on the National Pipe Organ Register.

Organists
Mr. Price. c. 1868
Hugh Brooksbank 1881 (afterwards organist of Llandaff Cathedral)
Douglas Redman 1881 – c. 1884 (afterwards organist of St Matthew's Church, Brixton)
Mr. Woodall c. 1886
J. Granville Smith 1889 c. 1891 – ???? (formerly organist of St Ambrose's Church, Edgbaston)
W. E. Abraham ???? – 1901
W. T. Jenkins 1901 – ????
Samuel Royle Shore 1908 – 1911 (formerly assistant organist of Birmingham Cathedral)
Thomas J. Richards 1911 – ???? (formerly organist of St Agnes Church, Moseley)
Ernest Edward Madeley c. 1923 – 1953 
Roy Massey 1953 – 1960 (afterwards organist of St Augustine's Church, Edgbaston)
Raymond Isaacson  1961 – 1967 (formerly organist of St Nicolas Church, Kings Norton, afterwards organist of High Wycombe parish church)
David Briggs 1979–1981

See also
Ark St Alban's Academy

References

External links 

 
 
 

Grade II* listed buildings in Birmingham
Church of England church buildings in Birmingham, West Midlands
Anglo-Catholic church buildings in the West Midlands (county)
Churches completed in 1881
19th-century Church of England church buildings
Gothic Revival church buildings in England
Grade II* listed churches in the West Midlands (county)
1865 establishments in England